Three submarines of the United States Navy have been named USS Barb, named after the fish, may refer to:

 , a planned 

United States Navy ship names